Dragons of War (1994) is a fantasy novel written by Christopher Rowley. The book is the third in the Dragons of the Argonath series that follows the adventures of a human boy, Relkin, and his dragon, Bazil Broketail as they fight in the Argonath Legion’s 109th Marneri Dragons.

When a religious uprising occurs in the hills of Kohon the 109th is sent to restore order but while the Empire’s Legions are scattered through the land the Masters of Padmasa launch a huge invasion of Kenor with the intent to destroy the nine cities of the Argonath. The 109th must fight their way through the mountains, with the assistance of the Wattel folk, to make their stand with the 66th Marneri Dragons at Sprian’s Ridge.

1994 American novels
Novels by Christopher Rowley
American fantasy novels